Violaceous trogon has been split into the following species:

 Guianan trogon, Trogon violaceus
 Gartered trogon, Trogon caligatus
 Amazonian trogon,	Trogon ramonianus

Birds by common name